= EC number =

EC number may refer to:

- Enzyme Commission number for enzymes
- European Community number for chemicals within EU regulatory schemes
